Alejandro Castro may refer to:

 Alejandro Castro Espín (born 1965), Cuban politician.
 Alejandro Castro Fernández (born 1979), Spanish footballer
 Alejandro Castro Flores (born 1987), Mexican footballer
 Alejandro Alberto Castro Castro (1988–2018), Chilean environmental activist